Madlyn L. Hanes (born 1948) is an American academic, and the former Chancellor of Penn State Harrisburg. She is now Vice President of the Commonwealth Campuses at Penn State University. Hanes graduated with her Bachelor's degree in English education from the University of Florida in 1969. She received her Master's degree in speech-language pathology and her Doctorate in curriculum and instruction from the University of Florida.  Hanes previously served at chief academic officer of both Penn State Great Valley and Penn State Brandywine.

References

External links
 Official website

Living people
American academic administrators
University of Florida College of Education alumni
1948 births
Date of birth missing (living people)
Pennsylvania State University faculty
American women academics
21st-century American women
Women heads of universities and colleges